Midnight Menace is a short American musical film released in 1946. It was produced by All-American News and Al Sack. Josh Binney directed. The plot involves a Voodoo practitioner making dead bodies appear around Lollypop Jones. The film features songs by Fats Waller and Andy Razaf. An alternative description of the plot says the film is about a Voodoo practitioner hypnotizing a man's wife and using her in his stage show.

The film was advertised as having an "All Colored Cast". Jones also starred in Chicago After Dark and Lucky Gamblers.

Cast
Sybil Lewis
Lollypop Jones
George Wiltshire
James Dunsmore
Harold Coke
Leon Poke
Amos Austin
Alma Jones
Jimmy Walker
Black Diamond Dollies

Songs
"Don't Sell My Monkey Baby"
"Honeysuckle Rose"

References

1946 short films
African-American musical films
Films about Voodoo
1940s American films